The Chapeltown riot of 1975 occurred on 5 November in the troubled Leeds district of Chapeltown in West Yorkshire, England.  They were not to be the last riots in the area following further rioting in 1981 and 1987 and further rioting in nearby Harehills in 2001.

See also
Chapeltown
1981 Chapeltown riot
1987 Chapeltown riot
Harehills riot
West Yorkshire Police
List of race riots

References

1975 in England
1975 riots
Chapeltown, Leeds
Crime in Leeds
1975
Race riots in England
1970s in Leeds